Shovel Ready is a science fiction novel by Adam Sternbergh. It is Sternbergh's first novel and was released on January 14, 2014 by the Crown Publishing Group.

A feature film based on the novel is in development by Warner Bros. Erwin Stoff will produce the film. Denzel Washington is expected to play the central role, a hitman in New York City.

References

External links
Review, Shovel Ready at Upcoming4.me

2014 American novels
American science fiction novels
American novels adapted into films
2014 debut novels
Crown Publishing Group books